Warrenpoint is a town in County Down.

Warrenpoint or Warren Point may also refer to:

Events
Warrenpoint ambush, an IRA bomb attack against the British Army in the town of Warrenpoint

Organisations
Warrenpoint and Rostrevor Tramway, a former tramway in County Down
Warrenpoint Town F.C., an Association Football club
Warrenpoint GAA, a Gaelic Athletic Association club

Geography
Warrenpoint (Knauertown, Pennsylvania), a historic home
Warren Point, New Jersey, a neighbourhood of Fair Lawn, New Jersey
Warren Point, Wembury, a promontory in Devon on the South West Coast Path, southeast of Plymouth
Warren Point County Wildlife Site, a wildlife site located on a promontory in Devon, northwest of Plymouth
Warren Point (Washington), a cape
Warren Point, Pennsylvania, a former town in Franklin County, Pennsylvania